The Sanremo Music Festival 1982 was the 32nd annual Sanremo Music Festival, held at the Teatro Ariston in Sanremo, province of Imperia between 28 and 30 January  1982 and broadcast by Rai 1.

The show was hosted by Claudio Cecchetto, assisted by Patrizia Rossetti.  Daniele Piombi hosted the segments from the Sanremo Casino, where a number of foreign guests performed their songs.

The winner of the Festival was Riccardo Fogli with the song "Storie di tutti i giorni".  This edition established the Critics Award, and the winner was Mia Martini.

Participants and results

Guests

References 

Sanremo Music Festival by year
1982 in Italian music
1982 music festivals